Dan Bullock (December 21, 1953 – June 7, 1969) was a United States Marine and the youngest U.S. serviceman killed in action during the Vietnam War, dying at the age of 15.

Early life and education
Bullock was born in Goldsboro, North Carolina. He lived in North Carolina until he was about 12, when his mother died and he and his younger sister, Gloria, moved to Brooklyn to live with their father and his wife. He said he wanted to become a pilot, a police officer, or a U.S. Marine.

Career
When he was 14 years old, he altered the date on his birth certificate to show that he was born December 21, 1949. He processed through the recruiting station, and enlisted in the U.S. Marine Corps on September 18, 1968. He was a member of Platoon 3039 at Parris Island. At first he struggled to make it through, but was able to do so with the help of one of his fellow recruits. Bullock graduated from boot camp on December 10, 1968.

Private First Class Bullock arrived in South Vietnam on May 18, 1969, and was assigned as a rifleman in 2nd Squad, 2nd Platoon, Company F, 2nd Battalion 5th Marines, 1st Marine Division. He was stationed at An Hoa Combat Base, west of Hội An in Quảng Nam Province. Less than a month later on June 7, 1969, Bullock and three other Marines were occupying a bunker near the base airstrip when a People's Army of Vietnam sapper unit attacked the base at night, throwing a satchel charge into the bunker killing three Marines; Bullock was just 15 years old. He had been assigned to cleaning duty that night, but was transferred to the night watch after one Marine was wounded on night duty.

After he was interred, his grave site did not have a marker. A veteran's marker was finally provided in 2000.

Legacy
On June 7, 2003, a section of Lee Avenue in Brooklyn, where Bullock had lived since age 11, was renamed in his honor.  In 2019, a North Carolina state historical marker honoring his life was erected near his childhood home in Goldsboro NC. Marine Corps League, Brooklyn #1, Detachment 217 usually holds a color guard memorial ceremony each June on Lee Avenue honoring PFC Bullock.

References

Further reading

External links 

 Dan Bullock on The Wall of Faces, commemorative website supported by the Vietnam Veterans Memorial Foundation

1953 births
1969 deaths
United States Marines
American military personnel killed in the Vietnam War
People from Goldsboro, North Carolina
Child soldiers
United States Marine Corps personnel of the Vietnam War